The 1956–57 season was Leicester City's 52nd season in the Football League and their 38th (non-consecutive) season in the second tier of English football.

Leicester ran away with the Second Division title, winning it by a clear 7 points to claim the club's 4th Second Division title and their second title in four years.

Legendary striker Arthur Rowley set the club record for the most goals in a single season by scoring 44 goals in 43 appearances. The club's tally of 109 league goals during the season also remains a club record.

League table

Club statistics
All data from: Dave Smith and Paul Taylor, Of Fossils and Foxes: The Official Definitive History of Leicester City Football Club (2001)

Appearances

Top goalscorers

References

1962-63
Leicester City